The artificer is a playable character class in the Dungeons & Dragons (D&D) fantasy role-playing game. The Artificer first appeared as a full class in the 3.5 edition of D&D and was introduced in the Eberron campaign setting. The artificer is a unique base class that reflects many of the core themes of Eberron.

Campaign setting
Though introduced as a wizard specialist in Player's Option: Spells & Magic (1996) and as a prestige class for gnome arcane spellcasters in Magic of Faerûn (2001), artificers were first added as a standalone class in the Eberron campaign setting. They are a major defining feature of a Dragonmarked house, House Cannith, and the common people in the metropolis of Sharn and other cities rely heavily on artificers to maintain the magical infrastructure. Artificers represent many of the high-magic elements of Eberron as a campaign setting.

Publication history

Advanced Dungeons & Dragons 2nd edition
The first appearance of an artificer was as a wizard specialist introduced in the Advanced Dungeons & Dragons 2nd edition supplement Player's Option: Spells & Magic (1996) where artifice was a newly added specialty within the School of Thaumaturgy.  This artificer channels magic into or through non-living items for their own personal use, thus any spells in the Enchantment/Charm school which happen to affect living things, and the entire school of Necromancy are opposed to the Artifice specialty and off limits to the artificer of AD&D 2nd edition.

Dungeons & Dragons 3rd edition
In D&D 3rd edition, the artificer was introduced as a base class in the Eberron Campaign Setting (2004).

The artificer's abilities act primarily on items and constructs. The artificer uses Intelligence-based Infusions instead of typical magics and psionics. Infusions work similarly to spells but must be implanted in a specific object, giving it a temporary magic effect.

An artificer can create magic items for which he or she does not have access to the prerequisite spells. Artificers receive a number of craft reserve points every level. These points can be used instead of experience points in the creation of new magic items. Thus Artificers are able to make use of item creation feats without the experience penalty that other spell casters must take.

Constructs, mechanical beasts, and particularly Warforged fall under the artificer's area of influence. Specific infusions can be cast to repair or inflict damage to any creature with a construct subtype. At fourth level Artificers may craft a homunculus companion. A homunculus is similar to a Wizard's familiar but more intelligent and generally better equipped to a single task.

No published race has artificer as a favored class, though being a warforged artificer gives players the advantage of being able to use infusions on themselves.

Dungeons & Dragons 4th edition
The artificer as an official base class appeared in the Eberron Player's Guide (July 2009). Shannon Appelcline (author of Designers & Dragons) wrote that "the artificer was the first character class to be playtested as part of D&D Insider, in an article that was collected in Dragon #365 (July 2008). The 4e playtest artificer was updated quite a bit for his first official appearance in the Eberron Player's Guide, with the biggest change being to his healing infusions, which was intended to help differentiate him from other leader classes. A design & development article in Dragon #376 (June 2009) provides interesting insights into the development of the artificer [...], such as the fact that special rules only used by the artificer [...] were replaced by more standard 4e mechanics [...] because the new rules 'didn’t amount to enough mechanical benefit'".

Artificers are arcane leaders. They can use rods, staves, and wands as implements. Artificers can also use arcane spells called infusions to imbue objects with magical power, and focus on buffing, healing and protecting allies. Many of their powers relate to weapons or armor.

Dungeons & Dragons 5th edition
The 5th edition version of the artificer first appeared in a 2017 Unearthed Arcana playtest and went through several rounds of public playtesting. The final version was included in the Eberron: Rising from the Last War (November 2019) campaign book. It was the first base class published for 5th edition since the Player's Handbook (August 2014). It includes three subclasses: the alchemist, focused on potions and elixirs, the artilerist, focused on ranged weaponry and defenses, and the battle smith, focused on constructs and combat. 

In the lead up to publication of Tasha's Cauldron of Everything (2020), an errata for the class was released which updated "several class features, while also streamlining the class a bit to make Artificers easier to play". Tasha's Cauldron of Everything includes the updated version of the class along with an additional subclass, the Armorer; this subclass is focused on armor modifications, becoming one with it, and refining its magical capabilities.

Reception
During the 5th edition playtest, Bleeding Cool wrote "if you happen to remember playing Dungeons & Dragons during the 3.5 Edition phase of the game, you might remember a class called Artificer. [...] Depending on who you ask, the character class was made either to enhance the Eberron campaign at the time, or it was simply put into the game to attract steampunk fans into checking out D&D. We’re guessing the truth lies somewhere in the middle. Artificer made it into 4th Edition, but was dropped [when] 5th Edition came out in 2014".

Charlie Hall, in his review of Eberron: Rising From The Last War for Polygon, highlighted potential game balance issues with the Artificer, the first new character class for 5th edition. He wrote "trouble is that one of the big issues with D&D over the years has been magical item spam. […] It got so bad in the 4th edition that the 5th edition introduced a system called 'attunement'. […] The Artificer class will be the first to allow players to attune to more than three magical items at one time. […] I'm just saying, as someone who has DM'd for quite a while now, maybe think twice about allowing an Artificer into your campaign. It might be a bit more trouble than its worth".

Corey Plante, for Inverse, wrote "Why has it taken this long for a new character class, especially one this awesome, to be finalized for D&D 5th edition? The answer is that if you want to tinker with magical inventions, the process takes time. […] Why is now the perfect time for the Artificer's big debut? The answer has surprisingly little to do with the game itself. Instead, it has everything to do with the setting of Eberron in this latest sourcebook.[…] In a world shaped equally by science and magic, there's no better herald than the Artificer".

Jeremy Thomas, in his review of Eberron: Rising From The Last War  for 411Mania, highlighted the multiple playtest iterations Artificer went through before being published in the 5th Edition. He wrote "the version we get rather effectively combines all those elements into a workable, balanced class that feels true to the spirit of the Artificer. Artificers create magical items and use tools to work their magic, and the subclasses (Alchemist, Artillerist, Battle Smith) give an Artificer some distinct roles that they can fill. They’re magic users, but they won’t be encroaching on the pure destructive power of wizards or sorcerers".

Christian Hoffer, for ComicBook.com, highlighted that the revised version of the class in Tasha's Cauldron of Everything (2020) included changes that "were made mostly to 'future-proof' the Artificer for future editions, such as giving the Artificer the ability to replicate any common magic item, as opposed to only common magic items found in Xanathar's Guide to Everything. [...] None of these changes are exactly groundbreaking or fundamentally shift what the Artificer can do, but they are significant quality of life updates that should make the Artificer a little easier to play".

Other media
The artificer appears as a class in Dungeons & Dragons Online (DDO). DDO community manager Amanda Grove said she enjoyed playing the class in the game, although she said using two hands to shoot rather than one was difficult.

Ashe Collins, for DieHard GameFan, wrote "I’m all for the new class, especially since it’s the first class we’re getting that is specific to the Eberron Campaign Setting, The Artificer. I’ve loved this class since I first read about it back when we were playing in Eberron, mainly because I love combining magic and technology. It’s no wonder that Techno-Mages from the Rifts RPG are some of my favorites to play and have as NPCs. In the setting the Artificer worked as a buffer for the Warforge class, but I’m thinking in the MMO it might cover the whole party. And with Crafting being in the game now, I also can’t help but wonder if the class itself might get some kind of bonus to making items or on items. Artificers are an interesting support class but I can see lots of solo builds coming out of it as well".

References

Bibliography
 Sharn: City of Towers (November 2004)
 Races of Eberron (April 2005) 
 Magic of Eberron (October 2005) 
 Player's Guide to Eberron (January 2006)
Eberron: Rising From The Last War (November 2019)

External links 

 Unearthed Arcana: Artificer (January 2017) 
 Unearthed Arcana: The Artificer Revisited (February 2019)
 Unearthed Arcana: The Artificer Returns (May 2019)
 Eberron: Rising From The Last War errata (November 2020)

Dungeons & Dragons character classes
Eberron
 Artificer